TY-90 is a Chinese air-to-air missile specifically developed for attack helicopter dogfights. Contrary to erroneous claims, the missile is not developed from MANPADS missiles, but instead, it is specifically designed as an air-to-air missile to engage in helicopter combat.

Design and development
Chinese determined that the MANPAD missiles converted for helicopter dogfights were not adequate, so a brand-new air-to-air missile specifically for helicopter use was sanctioned, and TY-90 was the resulting product. The  warhead of the missile is specially designed to sever the rotary wings with a single shot, and the missile has all-aspect attack capability. The missile is designed to ensure a single shot would be sufficient to down an opposing attack helicopter or at least knock it out of action.

At least three additional versions have been developed in addition to the basic version, two of them being air-to-air versions. The first adopts a dual-band guidance, adding UV to the original IR, while the second adopts an Imaging IR (ImIR) guidance. During the 5th Zhuhai Airshow held at the end of 2004, a ground-launched air defense version appeared, with the designation of DY-90, which was essentially the original TY-90, but with an additional option of incorporating a rocket booster to increase range upon customer's request.

A naval surface-to-air version is also developed, utilizing the FLS-1 system and the basic version with IR guidance, thus providing a fire-and-forget capability in comparison to the case where QW-3 is used.  However, this naval version has not entered service as of 2008, and the reason is reported that the Chinese military wants to wait until the more advanced dual-band or ImIR version can be incorporated into the FLS-1 system, which was under development. However, at Zhuhai Airshow, AVIC I, the developer of TY-90 only acknowledged the development and active marketing of such systems, but refused to further confirm whether the Chinese military or any foreign customers had placed any orders, and neither did the developer confirm such developmental works were privately funded by the developer or received any funds from the state or foreign customers.

Variants

SG-II ADS
In 2004, a land-based air defense variant of TY-90 is revealed to the Chinese public after entering Chinese service in small numbers for some time. Shengong (Deity Bow, 神弓)-II Air Defense System (SG-II ADS) is the upgrade of its predecessor SG ADS, with a quadruple TY-90/DY-90 missile launcher replacing the original Type 80 23mm AAA gun in its predecessor, resulting in the new SG-II ADS.  Like its predecessor, SG-II ADS is also a towed system and uses all other subsystems of its predecessor with the exception of the gun.  Because TY/DY-90 is a fire and forget weapon, no modification is needed for the fire control system of the original SG ADS.

Hunter air defense system
During the 5th Zhuhai Airshow held at the end of 2004, a mobile land-based air defense variant of TY-90 was revealed, dubbed as LS ADS, short for Lie-Shou (猎手, meaning Hunter) Air Defense System.  Eight TY-90 in two groups of four are mounted in the back of a Dongfeng EQ2050, and the fire control system consists of electro-optics including laser, IR & TV, mounted between the two quadruple launchers.

The LS ADS is developed by Norinco, with Dongfeng Motor Corporation as the subcontractor to develop the chassis (vehicle).  LS ADS is capable of being air transported, including being slung under helicopters. The system is operated by a team of two, one driver and one weaponry system officer.  The system can also be integrated into a larger air defense network.  A small number subsequently entered PLA service for evaluation purposes.

Type 92 Yitian
The TY-90 has mounted on the WZ-551 armored personnel carrier as an air defense vehicle for mechanized forces. In 2005, this mobile land-based air defense system was revealed to the Chinese public, called Yi-Tian Air Defense System, or YT ADS. The weaponry includes eight TY-90 missiles, QJC-88 12.7 mm heavy machine gun, and 2 sets of 4 smoke grenade dischargers. WZ-551 is the chassis of the Yi-Tian air defense system, giving the system amphibious capability and added protection.  Additionally, a light solid-state 3-D passive phased array radar is added to the fire control system, just above the original electro-optical fire control system, providing the ADS with a greater surveillance range. The radar can be folded down for traveling and transportation.

Specifications:
 Maximum target altitude: 4 km
 Minimum target altitude: 15 meter
 Maximum target range: 6 km
 Minimum target range: 300 meter
 Maximum target speed: > 400 meter / second
 Maximum radar searching range: >20 km
 Maximum radar tracking range: 10 – 12 km
 System reaction time: 6 – 8 seconds

Specifications (TY-90)
For air-to-air version:
length: 1.9 meter
diameter: 0.09 metre
weight: 20 kg
warhead: 3 kg
Maximum g-force: 20 g
guidance: infrared homing
fuze: laser proximity / contact
speed: > Mach 2
minimum range: 0.5 km
maximum range: 8 km
minimum altitude: 0 meter
maximum altitude: 6 km
single-shot kill probability: > 80%
developer: China Aviation Industry Corporation I

References

 TY-90 missile

Air-to-air missiles of the People's Republic of China
Surface-to-air missiles of the People's Republic of China
Guided missiles of the People's Republic of China
Weapons of the People's Republic of China
Naval surface-to-air missiles
Close-in weapon systems
Military equipment introduced in the 1990s